Giancarlo Dughetti (1931 – 1986)  was an Italian miniature painter.

Biography

Miniature painter and elder brother  of the engraver Roberto Dughetti (1938 - 2006) was  born in Florence on 10 March 1931. In the first years he painted some copies from Annigoni and famous classic masters. In 1954, at the age of 23, he held his first personal exhibition at the International Association of Lyceum Clubs in Florence  and achieved immediate success. In 1962 he married Anna Romagnoli who was his favorite muse and model. His daughter Simonetta was born in 1965. From those years onwards  his notoriety spread in Italy and abroad for miniature and pastel portraits for well-known personalities, among which, we can  remember: the Prince of Belgium Frederic de Merode, the textile industrialist Carlo Mantero and his wife Mirta Clerici Mantero, the Commendator  , the Senator , Amintore Fanfani, the Count Mario Tripcovich, the Countess Marie Henriette Zouboff de la Rochefocauld  In 1964 he portrayed the last Shah of Persia Mohammad Reza Pahlavi (1919 - 1980) and his family. Dughetti exhibited his works in New York, London, New Zealand, Australia, while in Italy he held exhibitions in Florence, Milan, Rome, Pisa, Verona, Mestre and Montecatini Terme. Between 1966 and 1979 he painted some  female portraits, nudes and female heads. In the same period he also began to paint on alternative surfaces such as small wooden tablets not  only portrait  miniatures but also still life and landscapes always of great value and sometimes with a faster and more gestural technique. Dughetti, the greatest Italian miniaturist of the 20th century, died of a cerebral stroke  in  Vignola at the age of only 54 on 16 February 1986.

Artwork
The miniatures painted in  the 1950s and early 1960s are of very high quality. It is sufficient to think about the play of delicate chiaroscuro in the "Portrait of Maria Ricciarda Annigoni" or the very delicate nuance that shapes the pearly complexion of "Sleeping Beauty", or the apogee of technical perfection in the portrait of "The father of eng. Giuseppe Voi". Between 1966 and 1968 he created three splendid miniature portraits of the art collector  Mirta Clerici Mantero (1920 - 2005) who had already been portrayed by Gregorio Sciltian (1900 - 1985). The first depicts her in the guise of Iphigenia in Tauris inspired by a painting by Anselm Feuerbach (1829 - 1880), the second as Eve in the earthly paradise and the third, dressed by flowers, in a park on the shores of Lake Como. Works  painted with a great technique in rendering the sitter with delicate passages of light and soft shades that are a tribute to the beauty, elegance, culture and refined tastes of the client.  In 1969 he painted a spectacular miniature inspired by the mythical queen "Nefertiti" (Thebes, 1366 BC - Akhetaton, 1338 BC) where the hypnotic fixity of the gaze with almost transparent eyes projects us into an almost enchanted and exotic atmosphere made of divine light. The same spirituality that can be admired in the "Prayer" also from 1969, with a female figure, inspired by the beauty of his wife Anna, who turns her intense and luminous gaze to the sky in a silent conversation with God where the words thought  by the protagonist rise to a universal feeling of Love.  In 1973 another important work, the miniature entitled "In the stable" where in a little surface the author offers a lenticular image of the milking. A work of profound realism  that shows two farmers, one  working and the other in a pause for rest and reflection that rises to the archetype of the simplicity and frankness of the rural world as "The Tuscan factor" painted only four years earlier.   Between 1974 and 1979 a series of female portraits and nudes among which: "La siesta" in 1974, "Woman who reads" in 1978 and the portrait of Ruth Baiter " in 1979. All works of  innocent sensuality realized  with a perfect  technique that  aimed to render the softness of the complexions through the use of warm and diffused sunlight., As regards still life production, which runs throughout the course of Dughetti's career from the 1950s to the 1980s,it's necessary a separate mention for the very high results achieved in  attention to detail,  splendor of  colors and  rendering of volumes. Images that seem to evoke, in their perfection, smells, flavors and tactile sensations in a universe of simple everyday objects, fruits, vegetables, flowers, fish and crustaceans painted in a dimension of lucid optical reality that  projects us into a lyrical atmosphere of remembrance.

Works
 "Ponte vecchio after world war II", 1945, oil on wood. 
 "Resurrection of Lazarus from Annigoni", 1949, miniature on ivory.  
 "The head of Medusa from Caravaggio" 1950, miniature on ivory.
 "To my mother, selfportrait", 1951, miniature on ivory.
 "Portrait of a girl" (1951), miniature on ivory. Don Shelton Collection.
 "The beautiful girl from Umbria" (1954), miniature on ivory.
 "Adolescence" (1954), miniature on ivory.
 “Self-portrait” (1954), miniature on ivory,   Uffizi Florence; 
  “The sleeping beauty” (1954) ed “Il quo vadis domine” (1954), miniatures on ivory at  
 "Annigoni portraits Commendator Mario Puccioni" (1954), miniature on ivory.
 “Portraits of Alfredo Cesarini and wife” (1955),  miniature on ivory, alla Museum of Fossombrone, 
 “Portrait of Maria Ricciarda Annigoni” (1957),  miniature on ivory, Academy of Art, Montecatini Terme, 
 "The father of ing. Giuseppe Voi" (1964), miniature on ivory.
 "Portrait of Benilde Gonzales Teran" (1964), miniature on ivory.
 "Portrait of prince Frederic de Merode" (1965), miniature on ivory.
 "Portrait of Ester Soli" (1965), miniature on ivory.
 “Portrait of Shah of Persia Mohammad Reza Pahlavi and his wife Farah Diba” (1965), miniature on ivory at Tehran Museum of Contemporary Art.
 "Portrait of Mirta Clerici Mantero as Ifigenia in Tauris", (1966), miniature on ivory. 
 "Portrait of Mirta Clerici Mantero as Eve", (1967), miniature on ivory.  
 "Portrait of Donato Sassi" (1967), portrait on ivory.
 "Portrait of Mirta Clerici Mantero on the shores of lake Como" (1968), miniature on ivory 
 "Portrait of Carlo Mantero" (1968), miniature on ivory.
 "Portrait of Giulio Carrano and his wife Lola Carbone", (1968), miniatures on ivory.
 "Portrait of lady dell'Acqua" (1968), miniature on ivory.
 "Convalescent" (1969), sanguigna on paper sheep.
 "Simonetta resting" (1969), sanguigna on ivory.
 "Nefertiti"  (1969), miniature on ivory.
 "Prayer" - his wife Anna - (1969), miniature on ivory.
 "Portrait of Sandro Sassi" (1969), portrait on ivory.
 "Portrait of the senator Giulio Maier"(1969), miniature on ivory.
 “Portrait of  Elda Grimaldi” (1969), miniature on ivory,  Uffizi Florence
 “The tuscan factor”, (1969) - his father in law -, miniature on ivory,   Modern Art Gallery of Palazzo Pitti Florence, 
 "Portrait of Gina Marchi" (1970), miniature on ivory.
 "Portrait of commendator Sada" (1970), miniature on ivory.
 "Portrait of Nella" (1970), miniature on ivory.
 "Portrait of a young lady" (1970), miniature on ivory framed in gold, diamonds and lapis lazuli made  by the famous goldsmith Romolo Grassi. 
 "Simonetta young dancer" (1971), sanguine on paper sheep, 
 "Portrait of Gina Marchi" (1971), miniature on ivory.
 "Woman with fan hand", (1971), pastel, Modena, Collection of Banca popolare dell'Emilia Romagna.
 "Girl with guitar" (1972), pastel.
 "Portrait of Teresa Beviglia",(1972), miniature on ivory.
 "Simonetta waiting for recital", (1972), pastel. 
 "Simonetta resting", (1972), tempera on wood.
 “Bianca” (1972), pastel,  collection Italian Academy - Salsomaggiore Terme.  
 Ritratto di Marie Henriette Zouboff De La Rochefoucauld (1972), pastel.
 "In the stable" (1973), miniature on ivory.
 "Portrait of the count mario Tripcovich" (1973), miniature on ivory.
 “San Giovanni Battista” (1973), drawing, Company of S. Giovanni Battista in Florence, 
 "Portrait of bersaglieri General Diego Vicini" (1973), miniature on ivory.
 "Woman putting on stockings", - his wife Anna - (1973), drawing with pencil.
 “Fulvia”, (1974), pastel,  Modern Art Gallery  of Sessa Aurunca (Caserta),
 "Stool with flowers" (1974), miniature on ivory.
 "The rest", - his wife Anna - (1974), miniature on ivory.
 "Love dream" (1975), miniature on ivory.
 "Portrait of Elisa died in 1972" (1975), miniature on ivory.
 "Tomatoes basket" (1975), miniature on ivory.
 "The basket of peppers" (1975), miniature on ivory.
 "Persimmons" (1975), miniature on ivory.
 "Love simphony" (1975), miniature on ivory.
 "Portrait of Brunetta Pieraccini" (1976), pastel.
 "The beautiful sleeper" - his wife Anna - (1976), miniature on ivory. 
 "Woman with straw hat", (1977) miniature on ivory.
 "Portrait of his mother", (1978) miniature on wood. 
 "Woman reading", - his wife Anna - (1978), miniature on ivory, 
 "Head of old woman" (1978), miniature on wood.
 "Head of old woman with hat" (1978), miniature on wood.
 "Female nude" (1979), monochromatic miniature on ivory.
 "The plant of happiness" (1979), miniature on wood.
 "Portrait of Ruth Baiter" (1979), miniature on ivory.
 "Woman seated" (1979), pastel miniature.
 "Woman on the sofa", (1979), miniature on ivory. 
 "Head of Madonna", -his wife Anna- (1979), miniature on ivory.
 "Nude of woman", (1979), pastel. 
 "Drawings for the portrait of Pope John Paul II", (1979-1980)
 "Portrait of Pope John Paul II" (1980), miniature on ivory, Pontifical Collections at the Apostolic Palace.
 "In the atelier", (1981), miniature on ivory. 
 "Basket with peppers" (1981), miniature on ivory.
 "Fruit basket" (1981), miniature on ivory.
 "Fishes" (1982), miniature on ivory.
 "Miniature and Scottish plaid", (1983), miniature on ivory. 
 "Cherries basket", (1984), miniature on ivory.
 "Steelyards", (1984), miniature on ivory. 
 "Selfportrait", (1985), miniature on ivory.
 "Leaves and fruits" (1985), miniature on ivory
 "Snowfall in Vignola" (1985), miniature on wood.

References

1931 births
1986 deaths
Italian LGBT painters
20th-century Italian painters
20th-century Italian male artists
Italian male painters
Painters from Florence
Italian portrait painters
Portrait miniaturists
Pastel artists
20th-century Italian LGBT people